Sisauranon, Sisauronon, Sisaurana, or Sarbane was a Sasanian fortress city in the province of Arbayistan, located to the east of Nisibis at the edge of the north Syrian plain. It was situated near the border with the Byzantine Empire.

Sisauranon is mentioned by Procopius in the 6th century. On linguistic grounds, it is identified with the way-station Sarbane in the 5th-century Tabula Peutingeriana, and with the modern site of Sirvan on the Turkish–Syrian border, whose name probably derives from the ancient settlement. The site is also variously mentioned as Sarbanon (τὸ Σαρβανῶν) in Theophanes the Confessor, Sisarbanon (τὸ Σισαρβάνων) in Theophylact Simocatta, and Sisara in Ammianus Marcellinus, as well as the variant forms of Sisaurion (Σισαύριον), Sisabranon (Σισαβράνων), Isauranon (Ἰσαυρανῶν) in various manuscripts of Procopius. The locality of Sambure in the Ravenna Cosmography may also refer to the same site. 

The fort lies on an artificial mound, some 545 m high, possibly of Bronze Age origin. As late as 2006, some of the fort's walls were still extant on the site, but the remains of Roman roads reported in 1927 appear to have vanished. Despite the small area of the present-day remains, which indicate a small fort, Procopius calls the site a πόλισμα, indicating the existence of a small civilian settlement.

The fortress passed into Sasanian hands in 363, and thereafter played a role in safeguarding the western Sasanian frontier against the Roman-Byzantine Empire. In 541, during the Lazic War, the Byzantine general Belisarius took over the fortress as its commander Bleschames and 800 Sasanian cavalrymen defected due to lack of supplies; they fought alongside the Byzantines in the Gothic War. In 589 during the Byzantine–Sasanian War of 572–591, general Comentiolus captured it once again. 

The Roman fortress of Rhabdion (modern-day Hatem Tai Kalesi, Turkey) is located on the steep slope just 6.5 kilometers to the north-west of Sisauranon. In the 19th century, it was erroneously identified as Sisauranon.

References

Sources
 
 
 
 
 

Sassanian fortifications
Forts
Former populated places in Turkey
Roman–Persian Wars
Arbayistan